Elections to Dundee City Council were held on 1 May 2003, the same day as the other Scottish local government elections and the Scottish Parliament general election.

Election results

Ward results

External links
Dundee City Council website

2003
2003 Scottish local elections
21st century in Dundee